Laser Doppler imaging (LDI) is an imaging method that uses a laser beam to scan live tissue. When the laser light reaches the tissue, the moving blood cells generate doppler components in the reflected (backscattered) light. The light that comes back is detected using a photodiode that converts it into an electrical signal. Then the signal is processed to calculate a signal that is proportional to the tissue perfusion in the scanned area. When the process is completed, the signal is processed to generate an image that shows the perfusion on a screen.

The laser doppler effect was first used to measure microcirculation by Stern M.D. in 1975. And it is used widely in medicine, some representative research work about it are these:

Use in Ophthalmology

The eye offers a unique opportunity for the non-invasive exploration of cardiovascular diseases. LDI by digital holography can measure blood flow in the retina and choroid. In particular, the choroid is a highly vascularized tissue supplying the retinal pigment epithelium and photoreceptors. Yet investigating the anatomy and flow of the choroid remains challenging. LDI provides high-contrast visualization of local blood flow in choroidal vessels in humans, with a spatial resolution comparable to state-of-the-art indocyanine green angiography. Differences in blood pressure drive the flow of blood throughout the circulation. The rate of mean blood flow depends on both blood pressure and the hemodynamic resistance to flow presented by the blood vessels. LDI can enable mapping of the local arterial resistivity index, and the possibility to perform unambiguous identification of retinal arteries and veins on the basis of their systole-diastole variations, and reveal ocular hemodynamics in human eyes.

Measurement of surface waves on the skin

The local velocity of blood flow measured by laser Doppler holography in the digit (photoplethysmogram) and the eye fundus has a pulse-shaped profile with time. These remote pulse wave measurements can be done clinically to reveal hemodynamics in arteries and veins and can be readily measured non-invasively. Principal component analysis of digital holograms  is an efficient way of performing temporal demodulation of digital holograms reconstructed from on-axis interferograms and can be used to reveal surface waves on the hand.

Use in Obstetrics and Gynaecology
LDI provides a direct measure of female sexual response that does not require genital contact; signals are gathered at a depth of two to three millimetres below the skin's surface. Two studies have suggested that LDI is a valid measure of female sexual arousal. Waxman and Pukall showed that LDI has discriminant validity; that is, it can differentiate sexual response from neutral, positive, and negative mood induced states. Compared to vaginal photoplethysmography (VPG), LDI is advantageous because it does not require genital contact. Also, LDI provides a direct measure of vasocongestion and has an absolute unit of measurement, consisting of flux or units of blood flow. The disadvantages of LDI are that it cannot provide a continuous measure of sexual response and the laser Doppler perfusion imager is much more costly that other methods of genital sexual arousal assessment, such as VPG.

See also
 Hot-wire anemometry
 Laser Doppler velocimetry
 Laser Doppler vibrometer
 Laser surface velocimeter
 Molecular tagging velocimetry
 Particle image velocimetry
 Particle tracking velocimetry
 Photon Doppler velocimetry
 Photoplethysmogram

References

External links

 LDA/LDV principle 
 LDV overview

Laser applications
Doppler effects
Measurement
Optical imaging
Female genital procedures